The Ashkar-Gilson Manuscript is a fragment of a Torah scroll, dated to the 7th century CE, containing a portion of Shemot (Book of Exodus). The section is a crucial text that displays the unique layout of Shirat HaYam (The Song of the Sea).

It was found in Beirut, Lebanon in 1972 by Fuad Ashkar and Albert Gilson, although it 
is believed that it may have come from the Cairo Genizah. Ashkar and Gilson donated the manuscript to Duke University. In 2007, the university lent the piece to the Israel Museum in Jerusalem, where it was displayed in the Shrine of the Book. During its exhibition at the museum, the manuscript attracted the attention of two Israeli scholars, Dr. Mordechay Mishor and Dr. Edna Engel. Close examination of the manuscript revealed that the fragment was the continuation of the previously uncovered London Manuscript, containing the passages of Exodus 9:18–13:2.

References 

Torah
Hebrew Bible manuscripts
7th-century biblical manuscripts